Vatica badiifolia is a tree in the family Dipterocarpaceae, native to Borneo. The specific epithet badiifolia means "chestnut brown leaf", referring to the colour of the dry leaf.

Description
The inflorescences bear cream flowers.

Distribution and habitat
Vatica badiifolia is endemic to Borneo.

Conservation
Vatica badiifolia has been assessed as vulnerable on the IUCN Red List. It is threatened mainly by urban development and expansion of palm oil plantations. It is also threatened by logging for its timber.

References

badiifolia
Endemic flora of Borneo
Plants described in 1967